Konstantinos Plegas (born 20 April 1997) is a Greek professional footballer who plays as a defensive midfielder for Super League 2 club AEL.

Honours
Olympiacos
Superleague: 2015–16

References

1997 births
Living people
Greek footballers
Greece under-21 international footballers
Greece youth international footballers
Football League (Greece) players
Super League Greece 2 players
Panachaiki F.C. players
Olympiacos F.C. players
Panthrakikos F.C. players
Panionios F.C. players
Doxa Drama F.C. players
AO Chania F.C. players
Anagennisi Karditsa F.C. players
Athlitiki Enosi Larissa F.C. players
Association football midfielders
People from Kalavryta
Footballers from Western Greece